Máximo Wilson Tenorio Quiñónez (born 30 September 1969 in Esmeraldas) is a retired Ecuadorian football defender. He was a member of the Ecuador national football team at the 1997 Copa América, and obtained a total number of 38 caps during his career.

Honours

Club
 Club Sport Emelec
 Serie A de Ecuador: 1993, 1994
 Barcelona SC
 Serie A de Ecuador: 1997

References

External links

1968 births
Living people
Sportspeople from Esmeraldas, Ecuador
Association football central defenders
Ecuadorian footballers
Ecuador international footballers
1993 Copa América players
1995 Copa América players
1997 Copa América players
C.S. Emelec footballers
CR Vasco da Gama players
Barcelona S.C. footballers
Manta F.C. footballers
Ecuadorian expatriate footballers
Expatriate footballers in Brazil
Campeonato Brasileiro Série A players